The BRD Brașov Challenger is a tennis tournament held in Braşov, Romania since 1996. The event is part of the ATP Challenger Tour and is played on outdoor clay courts.

Past finals

Singles

Doubles

External links 
Romanian Tennis Federation
ITF Search

 
ATP Challenger Tour
Clay court tennis tournaments
Tennis tournaments in Romania
Sport in Brașov